Frank Kooiman (born 13 January 1970) is a Dutch former football goalkeeper. He made his debut in Dutch professional football on 25 September 1994 for Sparta Rotterdam, replacing Edward Metgod in a game against Vitesse Arnhem.

References
Kooiman on Ronald Zwiers
VI Profile
Profile

Living people
1970 births
Dutch footballers
Association football goalkeepers
Sparta Rotterdam players
VVV-Venlo players
FC Utrecht players
PSV Eindhoven players
FC Dordrecht players
Eredivisie players
Eerste Divisie players
People from Vlaardingen
Footballers from South Holland